Evacuation immediate (SAME code: EVI) is a warning issued through the Emergency Alert System (EAS) in the United States to notify the public of a mandatory evacuation due to a wildfire, approaching hurricane, or an imminent explosion due to a gas leak. It is typically issued by a local or state authority and is relayed by the National Weather Service. The warning can replace a Civil Emergency Message, Fire Warning, or other warnings when required.

Weather radio receivers, EAS Equipment boxes, and TV scrolls will display EVI alerts as immediate evacuation, and any text-to-speech voices from the EAS boxes will read the alert as "immediate evacuation" rather than "evacuation immediate"..

Example of a NWS issued evacuation immediate 

MIC133-211815-

BULLETIN - EAS ACTIVATION REQUESTED
EVACUATION IMMEDIATE
EMERGENCY MANAGEMENT
RELAYED BY NATIONAL WEATHER SERVICE GRAND RAPIDS MI
1001 AM EST WED NOV 21 2012

THE FOLLOWING MESSAGE IS TRANSMITTED AT THE REQUEST OF OSCEOLA
COUNTY EMERGENCY MANAGEMENT.

EVART FIRE DEPARTMENT IS DIRECTING CITIZENS AND RESIDENTS IN THE
AREA OF U.S. 10 AND 60TH AVENUE TO AVOID TRAVEL ALONG U.S. 10 NEAR
THE AREA...AND FOR RESIDENTS WITHIN 1/2 MILE OF 60TH AVENUE AND
U.S. 10 TO LEAVE THEIR HOMES AS A RESULT OF A FUEL TRUCK ACCIDENT.

A TEMPORARY RECEPTION CENTER HAS BEEN ESTABLISHED AT THE EVART
HOUSING COMMISSION LOCATED AT 601 WEST 1ST STREET IN THE CITY OF
EVART. STAY TUNED TO MEDIA SOURCES SUCH AS LOCAL
TELEVISION...RADIO...AND NOAA WEATHER RADIO FOR FURTHER
INSTRUCTIONS AND ISSUANCE OF AN ALL CLEAR MESSAGE. FURTHER
INFORMATION CAN BE OBTAINED BY DIALING 2 1 1.

$$

References 

 https://www.weather.gov/help-map
 https://www.weather.gov/lub/nonweathercemdescriptions
 https://www.youtube.com/watch?v=QBN4nAyGk5A

National Weather Service
Warning systems